Kenneth Yen (23 May 1965 – 3 December 2018) was a Taiwanese entrepreneur who was listed as one of the richest people in the world.

Biography 
Yen was born in Taipei, Taiwan to 嚴慶齡  and 吳舜文 Vivian Shun-wen Wu. He attended Rider University in the United States where he studied business administration. He also received an honorary business degree from St. John's University. In 1986, he returned to Taiwan to lead the China Motor Corporation and Yulon, his family's business. Yen was officially named chairman of Yulon in August 2007. According to Forbes magazine, he had an estimated net worth of US$1.05 billion.

Personal life
Yen had one daughter, Michelle, and a son, John, with wife . He died of esophageal cancer at Taipei Veterans General Hospital on 3 December 2018.

References

1965 births
2018 deaths
Businesspeople from Taipei
Taiwanese billionaires
Rider University alumni
The Pennington School alumni
Deaths from esophageal cancer
Deaths from cancer in Taiwan